AutoWeb is an automotive media and marketing services company based in Irvine, California.

History 
Payam Zamani & Frank Zamani founded the original AutoWeb.com in 1994. they made a stock debut in 1999.

In 1995, John Bedrosian and Peter Ellis founded Auto-by-Tel LLC. Bedrosian was one of the co-founders of National Medical Enterprises, and Ellis was a car dealership owner in Southern California who became well known in the 1980s for his prevalent television advertisements. Auto-by-Tel was originally a syllabic abbreviation for Automobiles-by-Telephone but later became an abbreviation for Automobiles-by-Telecommunication, in order to incorporate the Internet into its name.

Auto-by-Tel was the first Internet company to advertise during the Super Bowl in 1997. The company went public in 1999.

In 2001, Auto-by-Tel LLC officially changed its name to Autobytel Inc. The company also acquired Autoweb.com that year from Zamani brothers.

On November 15, 2004, Autobytel announced to restate results  for the second, third, and fourth quarters of 2003, the full 2003 fiscal year, and the first and second quarters of 2004, due to its accounting problems covering a number of issues surfaced after the disclosure of a review by its audit committee. After further review, on March 15, 2005, the company announced that it also expected to restate its financial statements for the full 2002 fiscal year and the first fiscal quarter of 2003. This led to the filing of a class action lawsuit against Autobytel alleging that it violated Securities Exchange Act by disseminating false statements and inflating its financial results.

On April 25, 2007, Autobytel was named one of California's 15 best technology innovators at the California Innovation Awards.

The financial crisis of 2008 forced the company to reduce costs primarily by laying off a big portion of the workforce.  It also considered selling itself, but that plan was tabled in 2009.  The FY2012 results showed a small profit, suggesting the layoff strategy worked at keeping the business running until the economy recovered.

In late 2013, Autobytel purchased a portion of AutoWeb, a pay-per-click advertising network for automotive manufacturers and dealers. AutoWeb was a startup founded in 2013 in Miami, Florida by Jose Vargas, Matias de Tezanos, and Julio Gonzalez-Arrivillaga. Later that year, Autobytel acquired a $2.5 million stake in AutoWeb. Before Autobytel's suggestion of AutoWeb, the startup's founders planned to call the company AdTarget. Autobytel had taken the name from a company it had acquired in 2001 named Autoweb. On October 1, 2015, Autobytel fully acquired AutoWeb, Inc., in an all-stock and warrant transaction.

In October 2017, Autobytel Inc. changed its name to AutoWeb, Inc. and changed its ticker from ABTL to AUTO.

During the COVID-19 pandemic, AutoWeb received $1.4 million in federally backed small business loans as part of the Paycheck Protection Program. The company received scrutiny over this loan, which was aimed at small businesses. The New York Times noted their CEO's pay during 2019 was a reported $1.7 million.

In 2022, the company was acquired by One Planet Group LLC after disclosing doubt about 'going concern.' As part of the transaction, AutoWeb was taken back to a privately held company with Payam Zamani replacing Jared Rowe as President and CEO.

Services 
Through AutoWeb's marketing network, the company provides both automotive dealers and manufacturers with brand and product marketing opportunities.

AutoWeb offers automotive dealers tools to manage their businesses. Specific products include: the Rapid Response program, designed to connect dealers to online customers via phone, as well as the Email Manager program, which manages long-term email campaigns on behalf of the dealership. Additionally, LeadCall, a live call program that sets in-dealership appointments and scores customer readiness to buy for auto dealers.

References

External links
Official site

Online automotive companies of the United States
Marketing companies of the United States
Companies based in Irvine, California
Marketing companies established in 1995
Internet properties established in 1995
Companies listed on the Nasdaq
1999 initial public offerings